The 2016–17 Dijon FCO season was the 18th professional season of the club since its creation in 1998. During the campaign, they competed in Ligue 1, the Coupe de France and the Coupe de la Ligue.

Competitions

Ligue 1

League table

Results summary

Results by round

Matches

External links

Dijon
Dijon FCO seasons